Rivière-du-Loup–Témiscouata is a provincial electoral district in Quebec, Canada, that elects members to the National Assembly of Quebec.  It is located in the Bas-Saint-Laurent region. It notably includes the municipalities of Rivière-du-Loup, Témiscouata-sur-le-Lac, Saint-Antonin, Trois-Pistoles, Dégelis, Pohénégamook, Cacouna, Saint-Jean-de-Dieu, Saint-Hubert-de-Rivière-du-Loup and L'Isle-Verte.

It was created for the 2012 election from all of the former Rivière-du-Loup electoral district and part of the former Kamouraska-Témiscouata electoral districts; it also took Lac-des-Aigles and Biencourt from the Rimouski electoral district. Effectively, the entire territory of the Témiscouata Regional County Municipality was added to the former Rivière-du-Loup electoral district.

Members of National Assembly

Election results

References

External links
Information
 Elections Quebec

Election results
 Election results (National Assembly)
 Election results (QuébecPolitique)

Maps
 2011 map (PDF)
2001–2011 changes to Rivière-du-Loup (Flash)
 Electoral map of Bas-Saint-Laurent region
 Quebec electoral map, 2011 

Quebec provincial electoral districts
Rivière-du-Loup